João Cardona Gomes Cravinho  (born 1936) is a Portuguese politician. He served, among other positions, as member of the Portuguese Parliament (1979–1983, 1985–1989 and 1999–2002), member of the European Parliament (1989–1994), and as the Portuguese Territory Administration Minister between 1995 and 1999. He is a member of the PS political party. Cravinho has a degree in engineering.

In 2004, after the eruption of several corruption scandals involving people and institutions ranging from mayors like Fátima Felgueiras to football clubs (Apito Dourado), former Minister João Cravinho noted:
The political system has shown little efficiency in fighting corruption, tax evasion, and fraud. The successive governments did not engage themselves in that fight. Why? Because they want to win the elections… This is a fatal error that we should urgently terminate.

In 2006, as a socialist deputy João Cravinho was preparing a new set of proposals in order to improve the legal framework of corruption crimes, which included the investigation of someone, when that person's assets doesn't match with his/her declaration of income. The proposal was rejected by the Portuguese Parliament. Shortly after, Cravinho resigned from the parliament and went to England where he had been appointed administrator of the European Bank for Reconstruction and Development by the Portuguese Government headed by socialist José Sócrates.

Distinctions

National orders
 Grand Cross of the Military Order of Christ (8 June 2005)

References

1936 births
Living people
Socialist Party (Portugal) politicians
Socialist Party (Portugal) MEPs
MEPs for Portugal 1989–1994
Members of the Assembly of the Republic (Portugal)
Grand Crosses of the Order of Christ (Portugal)
Grand Crosses 1st class of the Order of Merit of the Federal Republic of Germany